Pankrti (The Bastards in Slovene) are a punk rock band from Ljubljana, Slovenia, active in the late 1970s and 1980s. They were known for provocative and political songs. They billed themselves as The First Punk Band Behind The Iron Curtain (one of their songs was titled, Behind the iron curtain old broads pull red beet). They are one of the most important former Yugoslav punk groups and one of the first punk rock bands ever formed in a communist country.

Biography
Gregor Tomc and Peter Lovšin, two young men from the Ljubljana suburb of  Kodeljevo, came up with the idea of forming a band in 1977. From the start, the band was heavily influenced by the UK punk scene. Tomc and Lovšin were the primary songwriters. Lovšin was the lead singer in the band, while Tomc came up with the band name and was the band's manager.

The band started playing in the fall of 1977, practicing in the basement of Kodeljevo's music school, and held their first concert at Moste General middle School. Initially, they played covers of established punk bands including the Sex Pistols, The Clash and New York Dolls. Some of the first original songs by the band that became popular were: "Za železno zaveso" (Behind The Iron Curtain), "Anarhist" (Anarchist), and "Lublana je bulana" (Ljubljana is Sick). They were included in the Novi Punk Val compilation album. They released their first album "Dolgcajt" (Boredom) in 1980 and gained the status of a cult band all over former Yugoslavia.

Their second album “Državni ljubimci” (State Lovers) was highly acclaimed by the public and gained an award for best Yugoslav album of the year.

In 1984, they released their Rdeči album (Red Album). The title is an obvious pun on the famous album by The Beatles with the colour red representing symbol of communism.  The album featured a cover version of the famous Italian communist revolutionary song Bandiera Rossa (Red Flag), which is one of their most famous tracks.

The last Album was Sexpok (1987, ZKP RTVLJ) produced by Tomo in der Muhlen at SIM studio, Zagreb

One of their last concerts was in Tivoli Hall in Ljubljana in 1987, named Zadnji pogo (The Last Pogo Dance). 

In 1996, the group temporarily reunited to perform as a support act for the Sex Pistols concert in Ljubljana during their Filthy Lucre Tour. In 2003, Pankrti were included in the 2003 Yugonostalgic Croatian rockumentary Sretno dijete, which deals with the former Yugoslav punk and new wave scene of the late 1970s and early 1980s.

Reunion
The band's founding members, Gregor Tomc and Peter Lovšin, who is now a solo artist backed by the band Španski borci (Spanish Fighters, referring to Yugoslavs who fought for the Republicans the Spanish Civil War), announced Pankrti's reunion concert in the Hall Tivoli for December 1, 2007 as a celebration of their 30th anniversary and it immediately sold out. This show was followed by performances in Serbia and Croatia. These events coincided with the 2007 Sex Pistols reunion for the 30th anniversary of Never Mind The Bollocks.

Popular references 
 A movie was made about their first album Dolgcajt (Boredom).
 Another movie named for one of their greatest songs "Totalna revolucija" (Total Revolution), examined the band's role in the appearance of punk-rock in socialist Slovenia.
 In the Croatian-produced movie Sretno dijete (Fortunate Child) they were also portrayed as having played a very important role as the initiators of a new music scene in Yugoslavia.
 An exhibition of their photos was held at the Modern Culture Museum in Slovenia.
 The rock band Azra mentions Pankrti in its song "Balkan":
Brijem bradu, brkove, da ličim na Pankrte
Translation: I shave my beard, moustache to resemble Pankrti (regarding Azra's frontman Johnny Štulić's transition from hippie to new wave).
 In the Slovenian film Outsider, some of the soundtrack is original Pankrti music and most of the characters were named after those from Pankrti songs.
 The Slovenian punk band Racija recorded a song entitled "To ni bla Metka" (That Was Not Metka), apparently parodying Pankrti's song "Metka". This Pankrti song was included in the Yugoslav new wave-related movie Dečko koji obećava in the scene in the student campus restaurant.
 The legendary BBC Radio DJ John Peel introduced them to a wider audience in Great Britain.
 NME wrote a few articles about them.

Members 
Peter Lovšin (songwriter/singer)
Gregor Tomc (songwriter/manager)
Bogo Pretnar (guitar)
Dušan Žiberna (guitar)
Marc Kavaš (guitar)
Boris Kramberger (bass)
Slavc Colnarič (drums)

Discography 

Lublana je bulana (1978, SKUC)
Dolgcajt (1980, ZKP RTLJ)
Novi Punk Val (1981)
Namesto tebe (1981, ZKP RTLJ)
Državni ljubimci (1982, ZKP RTLJ)
Svoboda (1982, ZKP RTLJ)
Rdeči album (1984, ZKP RTLJ)
Pesmi sprave (1985, ZKP RTLJ)
Slovan (1985, Slovan)
Sexpok (1987, ZKP RTVLJ)

See also
Punk rock in Yugoslavia

References

External links
Fan site, in English and Slovene

Yugoslav punk rock groups
Musical groups established in 1977
Musical groups disestablished in 1987
Slovenian new wave musical groups
Slovenian rock music groups
Musical groups reestablished in 2007
Musical groups from Ljubljana